Silas Gnaka (born 18 December 1998) is an Ivorian professional footballer who plays as left-back for German  club Magdeburg.

Club career
A product of Aspire Academy in Senegal, Gnaka signed a professional football contract with Belgian club Eupen in January 2017. He became a regular left-sided defender for the club under manager Claude Makélélé.

In June 2022, German club 1. FC Magdeburg, newly promoted to the 2. Bundesliga, announced that Gnaka would join the club for the 2022–23 season.

International career
In March 2019, Gnaka earned his first call-up to the Ivory Coast under-23 team for a pair of 2019 Africa U-23 Cup of Nations qualification matches against Niger. He was named in the squad for the Africa U-23 Cup of Nations finals, which took place in November 2019 in Egypt. He played every minute of the five tournament games, as the team finished runners-up after a 2–1 defeat in the final against Egypt.

In 2021, Gnaka was named in the Ivory Coast squad for the Olympic football tournament at the 2020 Summer Olympics. He did not make an appearance during the competition, while the team got eliminated in the quarter-final against Spain.

Honours
Ivory Coast U23
Africa U-23 Cup of Nations: runner-up 2019

References

External links
 

1998 births
Living people
Ivorian footballers
Association football fullbacks
Ivory Coast under-20 international footballers
Footballers at the 2020 Summer Olympics
Olympic footballers of Ivory Coast
K.A.S. Eupen players
1. FC Magdeburg players
Belgian Pro League players
2. Bundesliga players
Ivorian expatriate footballers
Ivorian expatriate sportspeople in Belgium
Expatriate footballers in Belgium
Ivorian expatriate sportspeople in Germany
Expatriate footballers in Germany